This is a list of episodes of the Japanese anime Kodomo no Jikan. The episodes are directed by Eiji Suganuma and produced by the Japanese animation studio Studio Barcelona. The anime is based on the manga of the same name written and illustrated by Kaworu Watashiya. The story follows a grade school teacher named Daisuke Aoki whose main problem is that one of his students, Rin Kokonoe, has a crush on him. A thirty-minute, uncensored, single-episode original video animation was released on September 12, 2007, available both on the anime's official website and in a limited edition version bundled with the fourth volume of the manga. The televised broadcast contained twelve episodes and aired between October 12, 2007 and December 27, 2007 on the KBS Kyoto Japanese television network. However, some of its content suffered censorship from animated panels, with some obscuring parts of the screen and using sound effects to "bleep" out dialogue in some instances, and others fully suppressing both audio and video. The uncensored version of the anime series were made available on DVD in six volumes containing two episodes each. The first such collection was released on December 21, 2007, with future releases to follow in one month intervals, ending on May 23, 2008. A second season consisting of four episodes, titled Kodomo no Jakan: Ni Gakki, was released exclusively on DVD between January 21, 2009 and July 24, 2009. Another OVA was released on January 23, 2011.

Four pieces of theme music are used for the anime television series; one opening theme and three ending themes. The second season OVA's opening theme is "Guilty Future" by Eri Kitamura. The second season's ending is "1, 2, 3 Day" by Little Non; except for episode three, whose ending theme is "Yoridori Princess" by Eri Kitamura, Kei Shindō, and Mai Kadowaki. In the 2011 OVA, "Rettsu! Ohime-sama Dakko" is used as the opening theme while "1, 2, 3 Day" is used as the ending theme.

Season 1

Pilot OVA Pre-Midquel

First series

Summary OVA

Season 2

Second Pre-Midquel

OVA trilogy

Third OVA

References

External links
Anime official website 

Kodomo no Jikan